Following the enactment of the House of Lords Act 1999, the number of hereditary peers entitled to sit in the House of Lords was reduced to ninety-two. Ninety of the first ninety-two were elected by all the hereditary peers before the passing of the reform. Since November 2002, by-elections have been held to fill vacancies left by deaths, resignations or disqualifications of those peers. Since the passing of the House of Lords Reform Act 2014, by-elections have also been held to fill vacancies left by the retirements of those peers.

Before the passing of the 1999 Act, the Lords approved a Standing Order stating that the remaining hereditary peers shall consist of:

 2 peers to be elected by the Labour hereditary peers
 42 peers to be elected by the Conservative hereditary peers
 3 peers to be elected by the Liberal Democrat hereditary peers
 28 peers to be elected by the Crossbench hereditary peers
 15 peers to be elected by the whole House
 The holders of the offices of Earl Marshal and Lord Great Chamberlain to be ex officio members. The current holder of the office of Lord Great Chamberlain was previously elected to the House of Lords in a by-election. As a result, there are currently 91 excepted hereditary peers in the House of Lords as opposed to the 92 indicated in the House of Lords Act 1999.

Elections must be held within three months of a vacancy occurring, and they take place under the Alternative Vote system. All those on the Register of Hereditary Peers are eligible to stand, but only sitting (the "excepted") hereditary peers may vote for the 75 seats reserved for a single parliamentary group (which can result in very small electorates, such as three voters in the 2003 election of Lord Grantchester); for the 15 peers elected by the whole house, life peers may also vote.

As of October 2022, there have been 18 by-elections among Conservative peers; 18 by-elections among Crossbench peers; 2 among Liberal Democrat peers; and 2 among Labour peers. In addition, there have been 13 by-elections by the whole House.

Current composition

, the party affiliations of the elected hereditary peers are as follows:

One additional hereditary peer is an ex officio member of the Lords: Duke of Norfolk (Earl Marshal).

By-election results

2003
After the death of the Viscount of Oxfuird

|- 
|! style="background:white;"| 
| Others 
| 37 others 
| style="text-align:right;"| 0
| style="text-align:right;"| -
| style="text-align:right;"| -
| style="text-align:right;"| -
| style="text-align:right;"| -
| style="text-align:right;"| -
| style="text-align:right;"| -
| style="text-align:right;"| -
| style="text-align:right;"| -
| style="text-align:right;"| -
| style="text-align:right;"| -
| style="text-align:right;"| -
| style="text-align:right;"| -
| style="text-align:right;"| -
| style="text-align:right;"| -
| style="text-align:right;"| - 
| style="text-align:right;"| -
| style="text-align:right;"| -
|-

After the death of Lord Milner of Leeds

2004
After the death of Lord Vivian:

2005
After the death of the Earl Russell:

After the death of Lord Burnham:

After the death of Lord Aberdare:

|- 
|! style="background:white;"| 
| Others 
| 10 others 
| style="text-align:right;"| 0
| style="text-align:right;"| -
| style="text-align:right;"| -
| style="text-align:right;"| -
| style="text-align:right;"| -
| style="text-align:right;"| -
| style="text-align:right;"| -
| style="text-align:right;"| -
| style="text-align:right;"| -
| style="text-align:right;"| -
| style="text-align:right;"| -
| style="text-align:right;"| -
| style="text-align:right;"| - 
| style="text-align:right;"| -
| style="text-align:right;"| -
| style="text-align:right;"| -
| style="text-align:right;"| -
| style="text-align:right;"| -
| style="text-align:right;"| -
| style="text-align:right;"| -
| style="text-align:right;"| -
| style="text-align:right;"| -
| style="text-align:right;"| -
| style="text-align:right;"| -
|-

After the death of Baroness Strange:

2007
After the death of Lord Mowbray and Stourton:

2008
After the death of the Baroness Darcy de Knayth:

2009
After the death of the Viscount Bledisloe:

2010
After the death of the Viscount Colville of Culross:

After the death of the Earl of Northesk:

2011
After the death of the Lord Strabolgi:

|- 
|! style="background:white;"| 
| Others 
| 4 others
| style="text-align:right;"| 0
|-

After the death of the Lord Monson:

After the death of the Earl of Onslow:

After the death of the Lord Ampthill:

|- 
|! style="background:white;"| 
| Others 
| 2 others
| style="text-align:right;"| 0
| style="text-align:right;"| -
| style="text-align:right;"| -
| style="text-align:right;"| -
| style="text-align:right;"| -
| style="text-align:right;"| -
| style="text-align:right;"| -
| style="text-align:right;"| -
| style="text-align:right;"| -
| style="text-align:right;"| -
| style="text-align:right;"| -
| style="text-align:right;"| -
| style="text-align:right;"| - 
| style="text-align:right;"| -
| style="text-align:right;"| -
|-

2013
After the death of Earl Ferrers:

After the death of the Lord Reay:

|- 
|! style="background:white;"| 
| Others 
| 4 others
| style="text-align:right;"| 0
| style="text-align:right;"| -
| style="text-align:right;"| -
| style="text-align:right;"| -
| style="text-align:right;"| -
| style="text-align:right;"| -
| style="text-align:right;"| -
| style="text-align:right;"| -
| style="text-align:right;"| -
| style="text-align:right;"| -
| style="text-align:right;"| -
| style="text-align:right;"| -
| style="text-align:right;"| - 
| style="text-align:right;"| -
| style="text-align:right;"| -
| style="text-align:right;"| -
| style="text-align:right;"| -
|-

2014
After the death of the Lord Moran:

After the death of the Lord Methuen:

|- 
|! style="background:white;"| 
| Others 
| 3 others
| style="text-align:right;"| 0
|-

After the death of the Viscount Allenby of Megiddo:

After the retirement of the Lord Cobbold:

2015
After the retirement of the Lord Chorley:

After the retirement of the Lady Saltoun of Abernethy:

After the retirement of the Viscount Tenby:

After the retirement of the Lord Luke:

After the retirement of the Viscount Montgomery of Alamein:

After the death of the Lord Montagu of Beaulieu:

2016
After the death of the Lord Avebury:

After the removal for non-attendance of the Lord Bridges:

2017
After the death of the Lord Lyell:

After the retirement of the Lord Walpole:

 Viscount Hill originally announced his candidacy but later withdrew.

2018
After the retirement of the Earl Baldwin of Bewdley:

 David Armstrong-Jones, 2nd Earl of Snowdon originally announced his candidacy but later withdrew.

After the retirement of the Lord Glentoran:

After the retirement of the Lord Northbourne:

2019
After the death of the Lord Skelmersdale:

|- 
|! style="background:white;"| 
| Others 
| 3 others
| style="text-align:right;"| 0
| style="text-align:right;"| -
| style="text-align:right;"| -
| style="text-align:right;"| -
| style="text-align:right;"| -
| style="text-align:right;"| -
| style="text-align:right;"| -
| style="text-align:right;"| -
| style="text-align:right;"| -
| style="text-align:right;"| -
| style="text-align:right;"| -
|-

After the death of the Viscount Slim:

2021
Normally, by-elections must be held within three months of a vacancy occurring, but on 23 March 2020 a motion was passed by the House to suspend any by-elections until 8 September 2020, as part of revised working arrangements in response to the COVID-19 pandemic in the United Kingdom. On 7 September, a further motion was passed by the House to continue the suspension of by-elections until 31 December 2020. On 14 December, a further motion was passed by the House to suspend by-elections pending a report from the Procedure and Privileges Committee. On 22 February 2021, a motion was passed by the House to continue the suspension pending a further review by the Committee after any adjournment of the House for Easter. On 26 April, a report of the Committee was published. The Committee announced that by-elections will resume and anticipated that pending by-elections would be held before the summer recess of the House.

After the retirements of the Earl of Selborne and the Lord Denham, and the removal for non-attendance of the Lord Selsdon:

After the retirement of the Countess of Mar:

After the death of the Lord Rea:

After the retirement of the Lord Elton:

After the death of the Viscount Simon:

2022
After the retirement of the Viscount Ridley:

After the retirement of the Lord Rotherwick:

After the retirement of the Lord Brabazon of Tara, and the death of the Lord Swinfen:

After the retirement of the Viscount Ullswater, and the Lord Colwyn:

|- 
|! style="background:white;"| 
| Others 
| 2 others
| style="text-align:right;"| 0
| style="text-align:right;"| -
| style="text-align:right;"| -
| style="text-align:right;"| -
| style="text-align:right;"| -
| style="text-align:right;"| -
| style="text-align:right;"| -
| style="text-align:right;"| -
| style="text-align:right;"| -
| style="text-align:right;"| -
| style="text-align:right;"| -
|-

After the retirement of the Earl of Listowel:

After the retirement of the Lord Astor of Hever, and the death of the Earl of Home:

 The Earl of Minto and Lord Roborough initially announced their candidacies, but subsequently were elected at a by-election earlier the same week.

Forthcoming by-elections
There are currently no forthcoming by-elections. Although there are currently 91 excepted members, no by-election to fill a 92nd seat has been called.

Historical by-elections
From the 1707 Act of Union to the passing of the Peerage Act 1963, peers in the Peerage of Scotland elected sixteen representative peers to sit in the House of Lords. Unlike Irish peers, however, Scottish representative peers only sat for the duration of one parliament before facing re-election. By-elections were held in the Palace of Holyroodhouse to replace deceased peers. After the passing of the Peerage Act 1963, all Scottish peers were entitled to sit in the House of Lords and the election procedure was abolished.

Also, from the 1801 Act of Union to Irish independence, 28 representative peers were elected from and by the Peerage of Ireland to sit in the British House of Lords. Like current hereditary peers, these representative peers sat for life terms and deceased peers were replaced in by-elections. Unlike modern hereditary peer by-elections, all peers in the Peerage of Ireland, even those who did not sit in the House of Lords, were entitled to vote. Upon the creation of the Irish Free State, the officers required to officiate these by-elections were abolished and thus no more were held, but those peers already elected kept their seats for the remainder of their lives. The last to sit in the Lords was Francis Needham, 4th Earl of Kilmorey, who died in 1961.

See also 
1999 hereditary peers' elections
List of hereditary peers elected under the House of Lords Act 1999

References

House of Lords
By-elections in the United Kingdom
Parliament of the United Kingdom
Lists of by-elections to the Parliament of the United Kingdom